Kevin Leahy may refer to:
 Kevin Leahy (musician) (born 1974), backing musician
 Kevin Leahy (Gaelic footballer), Gaelic football player for the Ballymun Kickhams
 Kevin Leahy (politician), member of the Western Australian Legislative Council
 Kevin Leahy (archaeologist)
 Kevin Leahy, translator for the English Vampire Hunter D novel series